Scd or SCD may refer to:

In medicine

 Salicylate decarboxylase, an enzyme
 Schnyder crystalline corneal dystrophy, an eye disease
 Sequential compression device, to improve blood flow
 Sickle-cell disease, a blood disease
 Specific Carbohydrate Diet
 Stearoyl-CoA desaturase-1, an enzyme
 Sudden cardiac death
 Superior canal dehiscence, of the inner ear

In engineering and information technology
 System context diagram
 , SCSI audio-oriented optical disk drives
 Slowly changing dimension, a datawarehousing term for data that changes slowly
 The Scientific Computing Division of the National Center for Atmospheric Research
 Substation Configuration Description for electrical substations
 Special category data, sensitive data as defined by the GDPR

Other uses
 , Brazilian satellites SCD-1 and SCD-2
 Sc.D., Doctor of Science degree
 Scottish country dance
 Senior College , now Blackrock Further Education Institute, Ireland
 Social communication disorder, a language disorder 
 Specialist Crime Directorate (Metropolitan Police), London, former branch
 Sports Collectors Digest, a publication
 St. Cloud station, Minnesota, U.S., Amtrak code
 Strictly Come Dancing, a British TV show
 Sylacauga Municipal Airport, Alabama, US, FAA identifier
 Syrian Civil Defense or the White Helmets,  a volunteer organisation